Carboxypeptidase B2 (CPB2), also known as carboxypeptidase U (CPU), plasma carboxypeptidase B (pCPB) or thrombin-activatable fibrinolysis inhibitor (TAFI), is an enzyme that, in humans, is encoded by the gene CPB2.

Function
CPB2 is synthesized by the liver and circulates in the plasma as a plasminogen-bound zymogen. When it is activated by proteolysis at residue Arg92 by the thrombin/thrombomodulin complex, CPB2 exhibits carboxypeptidase  activity. Activated CPB2 reduces fibrinolysis by removing the fibrin C-terminal residues that are important for the binding and activation of plasminogen.

Carboxypeptidases are enzymes that hydrolyze C-terminal peptide bonds. The carboxypeptidase family includes metallo-, serine, and cysteine carboxypeptidases. According to their substrate specificity, these enzymes are referred to as carboxypeptidase A (cleaving aliphatic residues) or carboxypeptidase B (cleaving basic amino residues). The protein encoded by this gene is activated by thrombin and acts on carboxypeptidase B substrates. After thrombin activation, the mature protein downregulates fibrinolysis.

Isozymes
Polymorphisms have been described for this gene and its promoter region. Available sequence data analyses indicate splice variants that encode different isoforms.

See also
Carboxypeptidase B

References

Further reading

Fibrinolytic system